'Nanci Guerrero' (born 26 September 1965) is an Argentine actress, presenter, comedian, and singer.

Early life
Guerrero was born on a 26th day of September at San Genero Norte, San Jerónimo, Argentina and grew up in Rafaela. She participated in and won several beauty contests in her youth. At age 17, she moved with her parents to Buenos Aires to start her professional career.

Career
Guerrero's career started with modeling for commercial and television ads. She began singing with her manager Eduardo Pérez Guerrero, who later became her husband. He established the musical group Las Guerreras which, in light of Guerrero's growing popularity, was renamed Nanci y Las Guerreras. She began starring in television shows and on stage as a comedian under the name Nanci La Guerrera. Starting in 1992, she was also a presenter of both live and recorded programs in and outside of Argentina, including Venga Conmigo, Jappening con JA, and Noche de estrellas. In 1999, she joined the cast of Sabado Gigante and later earned an award for her performance as Dr. Cosabella.

In 1997, she recorded her first album in the United States with producer Bebu Silvetti. The subsequent tour took her to Puerto Rico, Costa Rica, Venezuela, Colombia, and Ecuador. She recorded No Te Voy a Perder, a song composed by Rudy Pérez, for her ballad album "Las Guerreras." Her biggest hit was the duet Como Te Extraño with Leo Dan. She, her husband, Rudy Pérez, and Rafael Basurto Lara later produced an album anthology in tribute to Eydie Gorme.

Mondo Nanci Guerrero, a television special highlighting the beauty of Miami, Florida, USA, aired in late 2022.

Personal life
In 1995, Nanci settled in Miami with her husband, lawyer and producer Eduardo Pérez Guerrero.

References

1965 births
Argentine actresses
Living people